Erkan Mumcu (b. May 1, 1963 Isparta, Turkey) is a Turkish politician and the sixth leader of the Motherland Party (Anavatan Partisi, ANAP).

Biography
Mumcu was born in the western Anatolian town of Yalvaç in Isparta Province. His father was Süleyman and his mother Cemile.  He graduated from the Istanbul University's Faculty of Law.

He entered politics in 1995 as deputy of Isparta from the Motherland Party. In 1997–1998, Erkan Mumcu served as secretary general and in 1998–1999, he was vice president of the party. He became a member in the coalition government of Bülent Ecevit as Minister for Tourism serving from May 28, 1999 to August 8, 2001.

He joined the Justice and Development Party and was reelected from Isparta in the 2002 elections into the parliament. In the cabinet of Prime Minister Abdullah Gül, he was first the Minister of National Education and then the Minister of Culture and Tourism.

After a dispute with Recep Tayyip Erdoğan, he resigned on February 15, 2005, and joined the Motherland Party again. Erkan Mumcu was elected 6th president of ANAP at the extraordinary party congress on April 2, 2005. On October 25, 2008, Mumcu resigned the leadership of the Motherland Party.

He is married and father of two children.

References

External links
 Turkish Grand National Assembly official website 
 Motherland party official website 

1963 births
People from Isparta
Istanbul University Faculty of Law alumni
Government ministers of Turkey
Leaders of political parties in Turkey
Living people
Motherland Party (Turkey) politicians
Justice and Development Party (Turkey) politicians
Ministers of National Education of Turkey
Ministers of Culture of Turkey
Members of the 22nd Parliament of Turkey
Members of the 21st Parliament of Turkey
Members of the 20th Parliament of Turkey
Ministers of Tourism of Turkey
Ministers of Culture and Tourism of Turkey